Kuhenjan Rural District is a rural district (dehestan) in Kuhenjan District, Sarvestan County, Fars Province, Iran. At the 2006 census, its population was 6,692, in 1,646 families.  The rural district has 15 villages.

References 

Rural Districts of Fars Province
Sarvestan County